The United States and the colonies that preceded it built numerous coastal defenses to defend major cities, ports and straits from the colonial era through World War II. Some listed were built by other nations and are now on United States territory.

United States fortification programs

Colonial period through 1885

In the American colonies and the United States, coastal forts were generally more heavily constructed than inland forts, and mounted heavier weapons comparable to those on potential attacking ships. Coastal forts built from 1794 through 1867 were generally grouped into three time periods by later historians; these were marked by significant federal fortification programs with most forts built in a particular style. Forts of the first and second systems were generally earthwork star forts with some masonry reinforcement, mounting one tier of cannon, usually on the roof of the fort or behind low earthworks. Along with new forts, a few masonry forts of the colonial period were rebuilt under the first system, which was built from 1794 through 1801. The second system began construction in 1802, due to tensions with Britain and France that ultimately led to the War of 1812. Forts of the first two systems were usually completed in two to five years, due to their simple designs. The third system, developed after Washington, D.C. was captured and burned in the War of 1812 with its second system fort bypassed, had much larger forts than the previous systems. These were built primarily of masonry, typically with two or three tiers of cannon; two forts were completed with four tiers. All but the top tier of guns were in casemates protected by masonry. These were the largest masonry forts built by the United States, with many designed by US Army engineer Joseph G. Totten assisted by French military engineer Simon Bernard. All forts built by the federal government were designed and constructed by the US Army Corps of Engineers; however, some forts were built entirely with state or local resources. Until 1901 federal forts were garrisoned by various artillery units; following the Civil War most units at the forts were designated as heavy artillery batteries. Although designs varied, most were bastioned polygonal forts, having a large seacoast armament with musketry loopholes and howitzer positions to defend against land attacks. Work on the third system forts began in 1819. These forts took decades to build, and many were incomplete when funding was cut off in 1867, especially those begun during the American Civil War. Several forts had their designs modified during the Civil War for faster completion, but this did not always result in a functional fort by 1867. Earthworks built during the war are not included in this list. The siege of Fort Pulaski in April 1862 showed that masonry forts were vulnerable to modern rifled cannon, though the Union did not act on this until after the war. In 1867 funding for masonry forts was cut off, and work began on new batteries with earth protection, reinforced with masonry and often near previous forts. However, in 1876 funding was cut off again, with most of these batteries unfinished.

Endicott program through World War I
In 1885 the Board of Fortifications, chaired by Secretary of War William C. Endicott, met to lay the groundwork for a new coast defense system. New defenses were recommended for 27 harbors and river estuaries; most of the board's recommendations were implemented in what was often called the Endicott Program. The combination of earth-faced emplacements and disappearing carriages was intended to conceal the guns from an enemy; the airplane had not been invented yet.  rifled mortars and controlled minefields were also part of the program. A number of Endicott batteries were built near (and sometimes in) previous forts. Since everything had to be designed and built from the ground up, progress was slow until the Spanish–American War of 1898 potentially threatened the U.S. east coast with bombardment by the Spanish fleet. Only a few new batteries were complete by then, and emergency batteries were hastily built and armed with Civil War-era weapons, along with some new  guns intended for Endicott batteries but mounted on old-style carriages, plus some smaller rapid-fire guns purchased from the United Kingdom. In 1901 the artillery batteries were redesignated, with the light batteries becoming numbered artillery batteries and the heavy batteries at the forts becoming coast artillery companies, all still part of the Artillery Corps. In 1907 the coast artillery companies were split off as the United States Army Coast Artillery Corps, with the light batteries becoming the Field Artillery. The Endicott forts were fully funded during and after the Spanish–American War, and were substantially complete by 1906. In 1905 the Taft Board met to decide on further improvements. The United States had acquired Hawaii and the Philippines in 1898, along with the Panama Canal Zone in 1903. The Taft Board made fire control improvements at several harbor defenses, and decided on new defenses in the three new territories as well as Los Angeles, California. Since the Japanese were building capital ships armed with  guns, new weapons of this caliber were developed and emplaced in the four new defenses, though not at any existing defenses. In 1917, with World War I in progress and all major powers in possession of dreadnought battleships, the Army decided on a new type of battery. This would have two  guns in open emplacements on high-angle (35° elevation) barbette carriages to increase their range. Existing 12-inch guns were used for these batteries, eleven of which were in the continental United States (in most cases at existing forts), with two in Panama, one in Hawaii, and two one-gun batteries in the Philippines. The initial lack of protection from air attack was a significant problem with these batteries; their only concealment was camouflage and being set back from the coast, although their magazines were in bunkers. Most of these batteries were completed circa 1920.

Between the wars

Following World War I, the Army attempted further improvements, but in the peacetime funding climate little could be done. A new  gun was adopted, on a new barbette carriage with 65° elevation to allow plunging fire. However, with funding limited only eleven weapons of this caliber could be deployed by 1927; one on a disappearing carriage, four 16-inch howitzers, and the remainder in batteries similar to the 12-inch weapons, all at new forts except the disappearing weapon. The ports protected by these included Boston, New York City, the entrance to the Chesapeake Bay near Norfolk, Virginia, and Pearl Harbor, Hawaii. The Navy provided twenty 16-inch guns intended for cancelled battleships in the 1920s; six of these were deployed in Hawaii and Panama by 1935.

World War II

In 1938 construction began on two casemated batteries for  guns near San Francisco; the casemates protected the guns against air attack. After the Fall of France in 1940, the Army's Harbor Defense Board met to consider the future of coast defenses. The board decided to replace the turn-of-the-century defenses with new casemated 16-inch gun batteries with two guns each, typically one or two batteries per harbor defense command; most previous 16-inch batteries were also to be casemated. Due to their range advantage over previous weapons, most 16-inch batteries were at new forts, usually called "military reservations" to conceal their purpose. The long-range 12-inch batteries were retained and casemated, with a few built new. Due to circumstances requiring development of a new 16-inch gun for new battleships, the Navy released about 50 additional 1920s 16-inch guns. The 16-inch batteries would be complemented by  guns on new high-angle shielded barbette mounts with magazine bunkers, and new 90 mm (3.5-inch) dual-purpose gun batteries. Due to the diminishing threat of enemy surface attack as World War II progressed, especially on the east coast, of 38 16-inch batteries proposed only 21 were completed, and not all of these were armed. As the 16-inch batteries were completed the older heavy weapons at the harbor defense commands were scrapped, though some 6-inch and 3-inch guns were retained. Following World War II essentially all remaining gun defenses were scrapped by 1948.

List fields

State: The state in which the fort is located.
Name: The fort name, including prior names or names of prior forts on the site.
Location: The town, island, or other place name the fort itself is or was located at.
City or area defended: The port city, river estuary or delta, or other general area the fort defended. For 1895 and later forts, this is the name of the Coast Defense Command (Harbor Defense Command after 1925) the fort was part of. "The" preceding a place name means the area defended is a river estuary or delta.
Era(s): Periods in which major defensive or armament-related construction took place at the fort.
Colonial: Prior to 1775, or built by a country other than the US.
Revolutionary War: 1775–1793.
First System: 1794–1801.
Second System: 1802–1815.
War of 1812: 1812–1815.
Third System: 1816–1860.
Civil War: 1861–1867.
1870s: 1868–1879.
Endicott: 1885–1904.
Taft: 1905–1916.
World War I: 1917–1918.
Interwar: 1919–1939.
World War II: 1940–1945.
Activated: Year in which the first coastal fort on the site entered service, usually when completed or first garrisoned. Many forts were garrisoned but never completed.
Deactivated as coastal fort: Year the fort was disarmed (periods of caretaker status are not noted).
Deactivated as military post: Year the fort site was abandoned by the Armed Forces.

For new construction in World War II, locations with 6-inch guns are included only where they were the primary defenses in the area. All forts with completed 16-inch batteries are listed, but some were never armed. There were numerous other locations not listed with 155 mm, 6-inch, or 90 mm guns, some of which were called "Forts" while others were called "Military Reservations".

List of US coastal fortifications

See also

 Seacoast defense in the United States
 Harbor Defense Command
 United States Army Coast Artillery Corps
 United States Army Corps of Engineers
 List of forts in the United States

References

External links

 List of all US coastal forts and batteries at the Coast Defense Study Group, Inc. website
 American Forts Network, lists forts in the US, former US territories, Canada, and Central America
 FortWiki, lists most CONUS and Canadian forts
 US National Park Service list of parks with forts

Further reading
 

Military history of the United States
Coastal fortifications

Coastal fortifications of the United States of America
Coastal fortifications of the United States of America
United States, coastal